The 1987 Chattanooga Moccasins football team represented the University of Tennessee at Chattanooga as a member of the Southern Conference (SoCon) in the 1987 NCAA Division I-AA football season. The Moccasins were led by fourth-year head coach Buddy Nix and played their home games at Chamberlain Field. They finished the season 6–5 overall and 4–3 in SoCon play to tied for third place.

Schedule

References

Chattanooga
Chattanooga Mocs football seasons
Chattanooga Moccasins football